Harz is an electoral constituency (German: Wahlkreis) represented in the Bundestag. It elects one member via first-past-the-post voting. Under the current constituency numbering system, it is designated as constituency 68. It is located in western Saxony-Anhalt, comprising the district of Harz.

Harz was created for the inaugural 1990 federal election after German reunification. Since 2009, it has been represented by Heike Brehmer of the Christian Democratic Union (CDU).

Geography
Harz is located in western Saxony-Anhalt. As of the 2021 federal election, it comprises the entirety of the Harz district as well as the municipalities of Aschersleben and Seeland from the Salzlandkreis district.

History
Harz was created after German reunification in 1990, then known as Harz and Vorharzgebiet. It acquired its current name in the 2002 election. In the 1990 through 1998 elections, it was constituency 285 in the numbering system. In the 2002 and 2005 elections, it was number 68. In the 2009 election, it was number 69. Since the 2013 election, it has been number 68.

Originally, the constituency comprised the districts of Wernigerode, Oschersleben, and Halberstadt. In the 2002 and 2005 elections, it comprised the districts of Halberstadt, Quedlinburg, and Wernigerode. It acquired its current configuration and borders in the 2009 election.

Members
The constituency was first represented by Monika Brudlewsky of the Christian Democratic Union (CDU) from 1990 to 1998. Tobias Marhold of the Social Democratic Party (SPD) was elected in 1998 and served until 2005, followed by Andreas Steppuhn until 2009. Heike Brehmer of the CDU became representative in 2009, and was re-elected in 2013, 2017, and 2021.

Election results

2021 election

2017 election

2013 election

2009 election

Notes

References

Federal electoral districts in Saxony-Anhalt
1990 establishments in Germany
Constituencies established in 1990